The Battle of Ware Bottom Church was fought on May 20, 1864, between Union and Confederate forces during the American Civil War. The Union troops were led by Benjamin Butler, while the Confederates were led by P.G.T. Beauregard. The Confederates were victorious, and Butler's forces remained in their Bermuda Hundred defenses. Following the battle, the Confederates began digging a critical set of defensive earthworks that became known as the Howlett Line.

Ware Bottom Church
The church, one of the oldest in Virginia, was destroyed during the fighting.  The church stood until June 18, 1864, when it became a source of annoyance for Parker's Virginia Battery, only a few hundred yards west of the church.  Federal sharpshooters had been using the church to harass the gunners.  In 2009, 2 acres of this historic site was donated to the Richmond Battlefields Association by a local company.

Battlefield preservation
In addition to the acquisition of the two-acre historic site of Ware Bottom Church by the Richmond Battlefields Association, the Civil War Trust (a division of the American Battlefield Trust) and its partners have acquired and preserved  of the battlefield.

Gallery

References

External links
 U.S. National Park Service summary
 CWSAC Report Update

Bermuda Hundred campaign
Battles of the Eastern Theater of the American Civil War
Confederate victories of the American Civil War
Battles of the American Civil War in Virginia
Conflicts in 1864
1864 in Virginia
Chesterfield County in the American Civil War
May 1864 events